Pool B of the 2022 Billie Jean King Cup Europe/Africa Zone Group I was one of two pools in the Europe/Africa zone of the 2020–21 Billie Jean King Cup. Six teams competed in a round robin competition, with the top teams and the bottom team proceeding to their respective sections of the play-offs: the top teams played for advancement to 2022 Billie Jean King Cup Play-offs.

Standings 

Standings are determined by: 1. number of wins; 2. number of matches; 3. in two-team ties, head-to-head records; 4. in three-team ties, (a) percentage of matches won (head-to-head records if two teams remain tied), then (b) percentage of sets won (head-to-head records if two teams remain tied), then (c) percentage of games won (head-to-head records if two teams remain tied), then (d) Billie Jean King Cup rankings.

Round-robin

Sweden vs. Croatia

Austria vs. Bulgaria

Slovenia vs. Georgia

Sweden vs. Georgia

Croatia vs. Bulgaria

Austria vs. Slovenia

Sweden vs. Bulgaria

Croatia vs. Slovenia

Austria vs. Georgia

Sweden vs. Austria

Croatia vs. Georgia

Bulgaria vs. Slovenia

Sweden vs. Slovenia

Croatia vs. Austria

Bulgaria vs. Georgia

References

External links 
 Fed Cup website

2022 Billie Jean King Cup Europe/Africa Zone